William Beard was a New Zealand cricketer. He played first-class cricket for Auckland and Canterbury between 1878 and 1887.

See also
 List of Auckland representative cricketers

References

External links
 

Year of birth missing
Year of death missing
New Zealand cricketers
Auckland cricketers
Canterbury cricketers
Place of birth missing